Levy Nzoungou (born 22 January 1998) is a former professional rugby league footballer who played as a  for Widnes Vikings in the RFL Championship and previously with Albi XIII.

He spent time with St Helens and Melbourne Storm, playing with Toulouse Olympique in the Kingstone Press Championship, Salford Red Devils in the Super League, and on loan from Salford at Oldham (Heritage No. 1395) and the Swinton Lions in the Betfred Championship and Whitehaven in Betfred League 1. He has played for Hull F.C. in the Betfred Super League, and spent time on loan from Hull at Doncaster League 1.

Early life
Nzoungou was born in Brazzaville, Congo and moved to France at age 8.

Career
After impressing for France at junior level, Nzoungou signed with St. Helens and was a star player for their Under-19s academy team, later joining Melbourne Storm to play in the NRL Under-20s. After a very brief spell with Melbourne ended without playing a game in the 2017 NRL Under-20s season, he returned to France and joined Toulouse Olympique on a short-term deal, making his professional debut in the Championship in 2017 against the Rochdale Hornets.

In 2018, he joined Salford Red Devils and made his Super League debut against the Wigan Warriors. He also spent time on loan at Oldham, Whitehaven and Swinton Lions.

He joined Hull F.C. in September 2018, signing a two-year deal.

Nzoungou signed for the Bradford Bulls for the 2020 season, however due to the season being cancelled due to COVID-19, he signed a one-year extension.

In 2022, having retired from rugby after a number of serious injuries including a snapped Achilles tendon, Nzoungou trained as a firefighter and joined Cheshire Fire and Rescue Service.

References

External links
Hull FC profile
Salford Red Devils profile
SL profile

1998 births
Living people
Sportspeople from Brazzaville
Bradford Bulls players
Doncaster R.L.F.C. players
Hull F.C. players
Oldham R.L.F.C. players
Rugby league props
Racing Club Albi XIII players
Salford Red Devils players
Swinton Lions players
Toulouse Olympique players
Whitehaven R.L.F.C. players
Widnes Vikings players